Pedro de Godoy (1599 – 1677) was a Spanish catholic bishop and theologian. He was a thomist and taught at the University of Salamanca for 25 years.

Life 
Born in Aldeanueva de la Vera in 1599, he studied in the convent of San Esteban in Salamanca, where he later became the prior. He was ordained bishop of Osma in 1664 and then of Sigüenza in 1672 where he died.

As theologian he represented the last outstanding figure of the so-called School of Salamanca. His work Disputationes theologicae is mentioned by many scholars of the 18th century.

Works

References 

17th-century Spanish Roman Catholic theologians
Bishops of Sigüenza
Dominican bishops
17th-century Christian theologians
17th-century Roman Catholic bishops in Spain
1599 births
1677 deaths
School of Salamanca